Neale Francis Daniher  (born 15 February 1961) is a former Australian rules footballer who played with the Essendon Football Club in the Australian Football League (AFL). He was later the coach of the Melbourne Football Club between 1998 and 2007, and also held coaching positions with Essendon, Fremantle and West Coast. His brothers, Terry, Anthony and Chris, also played for Essendon. Daniher was diagnosed with motor neurone disease in 2014 and is now known as a prominent campaigner for medical research.

Early life and childhood 
Daniher was born the third child of James "Jim" Daniher and Edna Daniher (née Erwin) on 15 February 1961 at West Wyalong Base Hospital. He attended St Joseph's Catholic School, Ungarie for his primary education before going to St Patrick's College in Goulburn and later Assumption College, Kilmore, where he finished Year 12. He then went to the Royal Melbourne Institute of Technology University, where he learned about the emerging technology of the 1980s such as computers.

It was during his childhood that Daniher showed his love for sport, namely Australian rules football, playing in the Northern Riverina Football League (NRFL) on Saturdays while playing rugby league at school carnivals. During his time in the NRFL he won several best and fairest awards before going to college, where he played both Australian rules football and rugby union. In 1978  both the South Melbourne and Essendon football clubs approached Daniher as a player. After a legal battle between the two clubs, Essendon won the right to recruit Daniher as South Melbourne had signed a contract which said that Essendon had this right due to South Melbourne trading Terry Daniher to Essendon in exchange for Neville Fields.

VFL/AFL playing career

Essendon
From 1979 to 1990, Daniher played for Essendon in the VFL/AFL, playing only 82 games due to several knee injuries. He was appointed captain in 1982 but never led the side due to injury.

On 1 September 1990 Daniher, alongside his three brothers, made history when they became the first quartet of brothers to play for the same team in a single VFL/AFL game.

In the same year, the brothers also played together on 22 May 1990 in a State of Origin match for New South Wales versus Victoria.

Daniher retired at the end of the 1990 season but then played for Werribee in the Victorian Football Association in 1991.

Coaching career

Essendon Football Club assistant coach (1992–1994)
After his playing career was over, Daniher took up a career in coaching, with his first job coming when he became an assistant coach at the Essendon Football Club under senior coach Kevin Sheedy in 1992, which included the 1993 premiership before leaving at the end of the 1994 season.

Fremantle Football Club assistant coach (1995–1997)
Daniher joined the Fremantle Football Club as an assistant coach under senior coach Gerard Neesham for their inaugural season in 1995, where he served in that position until the end of the 1997 season.

Melbourne Football Club senior coach (1998–2007)
After his time with Fremantle, Daniher then became the senior coach of the Melbourne Football Club for 10 seasons from 1998 to 2007, when he replaced Melbourne Football Club caretaker senior coach Greg Hutchison, who replaced Neil Balme, after Balme was sacked in the middle of the 1997 season.

In Daniher's first season as Demons senior coach in the 1998 season, Daniher guided Melbourne to finish fourth on the ladder with fourteen wins and eight losses. Melbourne were however eliminated by the eventual runners-up North Melbourne in the preliminary final.

In Daniher’s second season as Melbourne Football club senior coach in the 1999 season, it ended up being a disappointing one, as the Demons under Daniher fell back to finish in 14th position, notching up just six wins and sixteen losses.

In the 2000 season at the Melbourne Football Club, Daniher led the Demons to the 2000 AFL Grand Final in his third season at the club where they played against his former team, Essendon, in a match that Melbourne lost by 60 points with the final score Essendon 19.21 (135) to Melbourne 11.9 (75).

In the 2001 season, After the highs of reaching the Grand Final, the Demons under Daniher slips out of the eight and finished 11th with ten wins and twelve losses.

In the 2002 season, the Demons under Daniher returned to the finals, defeating North Melbourne in the second elimination final at the MCG. However, the Demons under Daniher were eliminated by the Adelaide Crows at the MCG in the second semi-final.

In the 2003 season, The Demons under Daniher fell back down the ladder to finish in fourteenth position on the ladder with only five wins for the year and seventeen losses. The Demons under Daniher also lost the last nine games in a row in the 2003 season; this put Daniher’s coaching position under scrutiny.

In 2004, with Melbourne Football Club facing tough times in on and off the field areas, especially with Melbourne struggling for memberships and requiring the competitive balance fund for survival, Daniher made a more concerted effort to be more outspoken in the media – and became known as "The Reverend" for his "preaching" skills. This helped the club's membership and public profile (a semi-final appearance in that year's Wizard Cup also helped). After making the semi-finals of the Wizard Cup, the Demons under Daniher then led the AFL ladder after 18 rounds in the 2004 season by winning 14 out of 18 games, before a 4-game losing streak saw them miss the top 4 altogether and finish 5th, where they were knocked out of the finals in the first week by Essendon in the first elimination final.

The 2005 season saw the Demons under Daniher enjoyed a similar run near the top of the ladder, but another late-season fade-out saw them temporarily lose their spot in the eight, before reclaiming their position with close wins over the Western Bulldogs and Geelong, and therefore making the finals, when they finished seventh with twelve wins and	ten losses.  However, The Demons under Daniher were comprehensively beaten and eliminated by Geelong in the elimination final, which saw a second consecutive first week finals exit for the club.

The Demons under Daniher improved in the 2006 season, after losing the first 3 games of the season, the club then finished seventh on the ladder and therefore made the finals. Melbourne under Daniher eliminated St Kilda in the second elimination final in the first finals week. However, the Demons under Daniher were eliminated by Fremantle in the semi-finals.

In the 2007 season, after the Demons under Daniher started the year with nine straight defeats. They won their next two matches, but a poor showing in a 49-point loss against cellar dwellers, Richmond in Round 12, 2007, and sitting at fifteenth, the second-last placed position on the ladder, put pressure on Daniher's coaching tenure. On 27 June 2007, Daniher announced that he would resign as Melbourne Football Club senior coach at the end of the 2007 season. However, two days later, on 29 June 2007, Daniher reversed this decision and officially announced that the Round 13, 2007 clash against Essendon would be his last game as Melbourne Demons senior coach. Melbourne Football Club lost the game by 2 points. Daniher was then replaced by assistant coach Mark Riley as caretaker senior coach for the rest of the 2007 season.

Post-coaching career

West Coast Eagles general manager of football operations (2008–2013)
After leaving coaching, he became the general manager of football operations for the West Coast Eagles in the 2008 season; in September 2013, he stood down from his role due to health reasons but kept the condition private until August 2014.

Illness
Daniher was diagnosed with motor neurone disease (MND) in 2013 and the diagnosis was made public the following year. As of 2022, MND is incurable. Daniher decided to dedicate the remainder of his life to educating Australians about the disease. He became co-founder and patron of the charity, Fight MND, which raises money for research through major events, direct donations and the sale of clothing and merchandise including blue and grey beanies. The annual Queen's Birthday match between Melbourne and Collingwood has partnered with the Big Freeze charity organisation since 2015 as a fundraiser event for MND research.

Order of Australia
Daniher received a Member of the Order of Australia award on the Queen's birthday in 2016 for his efforts in raising awareness of MND and raising funds to help find a cure for the disease. He was promoted to Officer of the Order of Australia in the 2021 Queen's Birthday Honours for "distinguished service to people with Motor Neurone Disease and their families through advocacy, public education and fundraising initiatives".

See also 
List of Australian rules football families

Further reading
 Terry Daniher, Neale Daniher, Anthony Daniher and Chris Daniher. The Danihers: The Story of Football's Favourite Family. Sydney: Allen & Unwin, 2009. 
 Neale Daniher, with Warwick Green, When All is Said & Done. Sydney: Pan Macmillan Australia, 2019.

References

External links

 

1961 births
Living people
Australian rules footballers from New South Wales
Essendon Football Club players
Crichton Medal winners
Victorian State of Origin players
New South Wales Australian rules football State of Origin players
Werribee Football Club players
Melbourne Football Club coaches
West Coast Eagles administrators
People with motor neuron disease
Officers of the Order of Australia